The Slovak International in badminton is an international open held in Slovakia since 1993.
The tournament followed the Czechoslovakian Open, and it belongs to the European Badminton Circuit.

Previous winners

Performances by nation 
Updated after 2022 edition.

References

General

InternationalBadminton.org: 2006 results

External links
Official Website

Badminton tournaments
Badminton tournaments in Slovakia
Sports competitions in Slovakia
Recurring sporting events established in 1993